Immagine in Cornice, Italian for "picture in a frame", is a live concert film documenting the 2006 five-concert tour of Italy by the American alternative rock band Pearl Jam. It was released on September 25, 2007.

Overview
The film documents Pearl Jam on its 2006 World Tour. It was directed by renowned photographer Danny Clinch. The film includes behind-the-scenes footage as well as performances from the band's shows in Bologna, Verona, Milan, Torino and Pistoia, Italy. It was shot in various formats, ranging from Super-8 to high definition. Immagine in Cornice has been certified gold by the RIAA.

Track listing
Information taken from various sources.
"Severed Hand"
9/17/06, Forum, Milan, Italy
"World Wide Suicide"
Mixed from 9/14/06, PalaMalaguti, Bologna, Italy, 9/16/06, Arena di Verona, Verona, Italy, 9/17/06, Forum, Milan, Italy, 9/19/06, Palaisozaki, Torino, Italy, and 9/20/06, Duomo Square, Pistoia, Italy
"Life Wasted"
9/19/06, Palaisozaki, Turin, Italy
"Corduroy"
9/16/06, Arena di Verona, Verona, Italy
"State of Love and Trust"
9/17/06, Mediolanum Forum, Milan, Italy
"Porch"
9/16/06, Arena di Verona, Verona, Italy
"Even Flow"
9/19/06, Palaisozaki, Turin, Italy
"Better Man"
9/16/06, Arena di Verona, Verona, Italy
"Alive"
9/17/06, Mediolanum Forum, Milan, Italy
"Blood"
9/16/06, Arena di Verona, Verona, Italy
"Comatose"
9/20/06, Duomo Square, Pistoia, Italy
"Come Back"
9/20/06, Duomo Square, Pistoia, Italy
"Rockin' in the Free World"
9/20/06, Duomo Square, Pistoia, Italy
The end credits are set to "Love Boat Captain" taken from 9/16/06, Arena di Verona, Verona, Italy.

Bonus songs
"A Quick One, While He's Away" (9/19/06, Palaisozaki, Turin, Italy, with My Morning Jacket)
"Throw Your Arms Around Me" (9/20/06, Duomo Square, Pistoia, Italy)
"Yellow Ledbetter" (9/17/06, Mediolanum Forum, Milan, Italy)

Personnel
Pearl Jam
Jeff Ament – bass guitar, vocals on "Rockin' in the Free World"
Matt Cameron – drums, vocals on "Life Wasted", "Severed Hand" and "World Wide Suicide"
Stone Gossard – guitars,  vocals on "Better Man" and "Rockin' in the Free World"
Mike McCready – guitars
Eddie Vedder – vocals, guitars

Additional musician and production
John Burton – recording
Danny Clinch – direction
Brett Eliason – mixing
Boom Gaspar – Hammond B3, Fender Rhodes
Lindha Narvaez – production

Chart positions

References

External links
Immagine in Cornice information at pearljam.com

Trailer for Immagine in Cornice on Rhino Records' homepage

Rockumentaries
Pearl Jam video albums
Pearl Jam live albums
Live video albums
2007 video albums
2007 live albums